Nalanda Medical College and Hospital (NMCH) or Govt. Medical college Nalanda is a public medical college based in Patna, India. The institute was established in 1970 and is situated in Kankarbagh and joint hospital is in agamkuan . It had a capacity of 100 students in each batch until 2018. Since 2019 session the intake capacity has been increased to 120 students. Its session intake capacity is now increased from 120 to 150 for the year 2020.It has been proposed to increase it to 250 students per batch in coming years. Nalanda Medical College is a Government-funded institute affiliated to Aryabhatta Knowledge University, Patna. It is recognized by Medical Council of India.  It offers undergraduate courses MBBS as well as post-graduate courses in medicine, surgery, gynaecology, anaesthesiology, pediatrics, dermatology, orthopedics, ENT, preventive and social medicine, pathology, pharmacology, forensic medicine and toxicology, microbiology, physiology, and biochemistry.

In March 2020 it was declared by the government as a coronavirus hospital.

History
Nalanda Medical College, Patna, was established in 1970 as a private medical college. It was established by Dr. Vijay Narayain Singh, Dr. Madhusudan Das and Dr. Shailendra Kumar Sinha, along with Shri Krishna Kant Singh, the ex-education minister of Bihar.

Overview
The hospital has about 750 normal beds and 200 emergency beds. It has two campuses spread over 100 acres. The college campus at Bhoothnath has an administrative building, UG hostels (for boys and girls), a college library, lecture theatre and buildings for non-clinical and para-clinical subjects and doctors' quarters. The hospital campus at Agamkuan beside RMRI has hospital buildings, a centre of excellence, vaccine house, and hostel for interns, Pgs, and nursing students.

Centre of excellence is located at hospital campus where all types of diagnostics and investigation services are done and a blood bank is also present there. It has two auditoriums, one at the college campus and another one at the hospital campus. It has a seminar hall which is fully air-conditioned with a multimedia projector and other audio-video aids.

At hospital campus the following services are provided:
OPD and IPD services
Counselling
Diagnostic and investigation services
Teaching for undergraduates and postgraduates
NMCH provides degree courses in MBBS, MS, MD and it also provides Bsc.nursing degree and ANM, GNM training.

The college offers the four-and-a-half-year M.B.B.S. course with a one-year compulsory rotating internship in affiliated hospitals. The undergraduate seats are filled through a single-window all-India medical test known as NEET-UG of which 85% admissions are done by the BCECE at the state level and 15% through NEET counselling at the national level.

The college offers more than 80 seats in postgraduate courses.

Connectivity
The college is situated at Kankarbagh Road near Bazar Samiti, and is easily reachable by autos. The hospital is situated in Agamkuan.

Distance from:
Patna Junction: 5–6 km
Airport:  13–14 km
Mithapur Bus Stand: 8–9 km

Staff
Principal: Dr. (Mr.) H. L. Mahto

Superintendent: Dr. Renu Rohatagi

Deputy Superintendent: Dr. Ajay Kumar Sinha

Coordinator, Medical Education Unit: Dr Amita Sinha

Notable alumni
Pranava Prakash, artist

See also

References

External links
www.bihareducation.net
NMCH official website
List of colleges teaching MBBS in India

Educational institutions established in 1970
Education in Patna
Medical colleges in Bihar
Hospitals in Patna
Colleges affiliated to Aryabhatta Knowledge University
1970 establishments in Bihar